True Stories was an Australian biographical documentary series which explored the personal journeys of ordinary, and sometimes extraordinary Australians. It is based on the ABC's Australian Story. The 4-episode first season of the program rated well, attracting an average of over 1.7 million viewers per episode. As a result, Channel Seven announced a second season, consisting of over 20 episodes which aired from mid-2006. Original host Anna Coren did not front the entire second season as mid-way through production Coren was posted as U.S. Correspondent for Seven. Because of this, several episodes were presented by Chris Bath.

Season two episode summaries

Dylan's Story
Original airdate: 9 July 2006

Dylan Hartung is a 7-year-old boy diagnosed with Stage IV Neuroblastoma in 2004. Doctors in Australia were True Stories followed his trip to Australia for treatment at the Memorial Sloan-Kettering Cancer Center.

Tim's Story
Original airdate: 23 July 2006

Truck driver Tim Stuhlfauth was hijacked, held at gunpoint for 16 hours and forced to drive his rig without a break as the madman fired shots in the cabin of his truck. As the terrifying ordeal unfolded Tim thought he'd never see his family again convinced he was going to be killed. The hijacking came to a dramatic conclusion thanks to Tim's quick thinking. The story took a dramatic twist when the identity of the gunman was finally revealed. Tragic story with heart warming scenes that will make your day.

Ratings

Season one (2005) 
The first season of True Stories aired 8:00pm Tuesday nights on the Seven Network. It won its timeslot every week, benefitting strongly from the program preceding it, Border Security, which regularly topped 2 million viewers. Episodes of True Stories that came first in their timeslots have been highlighted in grey.

See also
 List of Seven Network programs

References

External links
True Stories at the National Film and Sound Archive

Seven Network original programming
2000s Australian documentary television series
2005 Australian television series debuts